Frances Marshall may refer to:

 Frances Partridge (1900–2004), née Marshall, English writer
 Frances L. Marshall (died 1920), British author

See also 
 Francis Marshall (disambiguation)